Minrecordite, CaZn(CO3)2 , is a very rare mineral belonging to the dolomite group, the member with Ca and Zn. It was discovered, associated with dioptase, in a specimen from the Tsumeb mine (Namibia), which is consequently its type locality. Its name is a tribute to The Mineralogical Record magazine, representing the collaboration between professional and amateur mineralogists. In this locality it is associated primarily with dioptase, and less frequently with duftite, calcite and malachite. It is a rare mineral, which has been found only in a few deposits in the world. In addition to the type locality, it appears in the Preguiça mine, in Moura, district of Beja (Portugal) .

References 

Carbonate minerals
Zinc minerals
Minerals described in 1982